St Martin's Church, North Leverton is a Grade I listed parish church in the Church of England in North Leverton.

History

The church was built in the 12th century, the oldest part of it being the south doorway of ca. 1200. The ornate window tracery of the south aisle and the chancel, dating from ca. 1300–40, is the chief feature of interest. The west tower is Perpendicular. It was restored in the 19th century.

References

12th-century church buildings in England
Church of England church buildings in Nottinghamshire
Grade I listed churches in Nottinghamshire